Prusinowo Wałeckie  is a village in the administrative district of Gmina Wałcz, within Wałcz County, West Pomeranian Voivodeship, in north-western Poland.

References

Villages in Wałcz County